Mary Beth Ruskai (born 1944) is an American mathematical physicist and Professor Emerita of Mathematics  at the University of Massachusetts, with interest in mathematical problems in quantum theory.  She is a Fellow of the AAAS, AMS, APS, and AWM.

Education
Ruskai graduated from Notre Dame College in Cleveland, Ohio in 1965 with a BS in chemistry.
She simultaneously received her M.A. in mathematics and her Ph.D. in physical chemistry from the University of Wisconsin–Madison in 1969.

Career

She was the Battelle postdoctoral fellow in mathematical physics at the Institut de Physique Theorique in Geneva Switzerland from 1969 to 1971.   She spent most of her career at the University of Massachusetts Lowell, where she was on the faculty from 1977 until she took early retirement in 2002.  From 2003 to 2013 she was based at Tufts University, and is currently an associate member of the Institute for Quantum Computing.
  
Her visiting positions include appointments at  MIT, Bell Labs, the University of Oregon, Rockefeller University, the University of Vienna, the Bunting Institute (later renamed the Radcliffe Institute for Advanced Studies), the Courant Institute of Mathematical Sciences at NYU, Georgia Tech, the Technical University of Berlin, the Dublin Institute of Technology and the Institute for Quantum Computing in Waterloo, Canada.    In 1995 she was the Flora Stone Mather Visiting Professor at Case Western Reserve University in her hometown of Cleveland, Ohio.  Its predecessor, the Case Institute of Technology did not admit women until after she received her B.S. in 1965.

Research
Ruskai's research focuses on mathematics applicable to quantum mechanics.  In 1972 she and Elliot Lieb proved the Strong Subadditivity of Quantum Entropy, which was described in 2005 as "the key result on which virtually every nontrivial quantum coding theorem (in quantum information theory) relies".  In 1981 she gave the first proof that an atom can have only a maximum number of electrons bound to it regardless of the charge of its nucleus.

Other activities
Ruskai has been an organizer of international conferences, especially those with an interdisciplinary focus.  Of particular note was her organization of the first US conference on wavelet theory, at which Ingrid Daubechies gave Ten Lectures on Wavelets.  Ruskai considers this one of her most important achievements.  She was also an organizer of conferences in Quantum Information Theory, including the Fall 2010 program at the Mittag-Leffler Institute, as well as a series of workshops at the Banff International Research Station and the Fields Institute.

Throughout her career, Ruskai has been an advocate for women in mathematics and has published 15 articles on gender and science.

References
Charlene Morrow and Teri Peri (eds), Notable Women in Mathematics, Greenwood Press, 1998, pp. 200–204.

1944 births
Living people
Notre Dame College (Ohio) alumni
University of Wisconsin–Madison College of Letters and Science alumni
University of Massachusetts faculty
20th-century American mathematicians
21st-century American mathematicians
American women mathematicians
Fellows of the American Mathematical Society
20th-century women mathematicians
21st-century women mathematicians
20th-century American women
21st-century American women
Fellows of the American Physical Society